Dunstan is a census-designated place (CDP) in the town of Scarborough, Cumberland County, Maine, United States. Also known as West Scarborough, the community is in the southwest part of the town, along U.S. Route 1. Maine State Route 9 runs northward from Dunstan with US 1 towards Portland but leads southeast out of the community as Pine Point Road, towards Old Orchard Beach. Interstate 95 (the Maine Turnpike) forms the northwest edge of the CDP, and the York County line is the southwest border, with the city of Saco directly adjacent to Dunstan. The northeast edge of the CDP is the Dunstan River, an arm of the tidal Scarborough River.

Dunstan was first listed as a CDP prior to the 2020 census.

Demographics

References 

Census-designated places in Cumberland County, Maine
Census-designated places in Maine
Scarborough, Maine